Jordanita chloronota is a moth of the family Zygaenidae. It is found in southern Turkey, where it is only known from the southern side of the Taurus Mountains.

The length of the forewings is 12–13.1 mm for males and 9–10 mm for females. Adults are on wing in June.

References

C. M. Naumann, W. G. Tremewan: The Western Palaearctic Zygaenidae. Apollo Books, Stenstrup 1999, 

Procridinae
Endemic fauna of Turkey
Moths described in 1871
Insects of Turkey